Staf Scheirlinckx (born 12 March 1979 in Herzele) is a Belgian former professional road bicycle racer. His brother, Bert Scheirlinckx, is also a professional cyclist.

Scheirlinckx retired at the end of the 2013 season, after fourteen years as a professional.

Major results

1999
 6th Memorial Van Coningsloo
2001
 2nd Overall Tour de la Somme
1st Stage 1
2003
 2nd Giro d'Oro
 4th Overall Étoile de Bessèges
 5th GP S.A.T.S.
 7th Casalincontrada-Block Haus
 7th Nationale Sluitingsprijs
2004
 4th Overall Étoile de Bessèges
 9th Tour du Doubs
2005
 5th Paris–Bourges
2006
 10th Paris–Roubaix
2007
 3rd Grand Prix d'Ouverture La Marseillaise
 5th Le Samyn
2008
 8th Le Samyn
 10th E3 Prijs Vlaanderen
2010
 5th Grand Prix Cycliste de Québec
 5th Coppa Sabatini
2011
 8th Tour of Flanders
2012
 10th Omloop Het Nieuwsblad

References

External links 

Palmares at CyclingBase

1979 births
Living people
Belgian male cyclists
Cyclists from East Flanders
People from Herzele